Adv. G. R. Anil is an Indian politician  currently serving as the Minister for Food and Civil Supplies, Consumer Affairs, Legal Metrology, Government of Kerala; represents Nedumangad Constituency in 15th Kerala Legislative Assembly.

Early life and education 

Adv. G. R. Anil was born to V Ramankuttipillai and G Sarojiniamma on 30 May 1963 at Nadukadu, Thiruvananthapuram. He did his schooling at Salvation Army School, Nadukkadu; Krishnapuram Upper Primary School, and SMV High School, Thiruvananthapuram. The CPI leader pursued his higher education from MG College, University College, and Kerala Law Academy Law College, all in Thiruvananthapuram.

Political career 

He was active in the All India Students Federation (AISF) since his school days and later became unit secretary of AISF in University College. During his college days, G.R. Anil was elected as Union General Secretary, University College of Kerala marking his entry to the electoral politics. In succeeding years, he became district secretary of AISF, AIYF, and Kisan Sabha besides being a state-level office bearer of these organizations. He served as the Communist Party of India (CPI) Thiruvananthapuram district assistant secretary  till 2014 and later held the office of CPI Thiruvananthapuram district secretary till 2021. He has been a member of CPI State Council for the last 12 years.

From 2000 to 2010 he served as an elected representative from Nemom ward of Thiruvananthapuram Cooperation. During this highly appreciated tenure as a ward councilor, he served as Chairman of Health and Education Standing Committee from 2005 to 2010 in which many an exemplary activity such as the launch of the project for clean-up drive of Thiruvananthapuram City immediately on conclusion of world-famous Attukal Pongala, Unarvu Scheme for providing free break-fast to school students covering around 25000 children in the state capital, establishment of electric crematorium (Shantikavadam) etc. were being launched under his able leadership, bestowing high accolades to the local body from all over India.

The CPI leader previously held several positions such as district and state office-bearer of several organizations such as Director Board member of Oushadi, Working committee member AITUC State council, Director of Kerala State Handloom Weavers Cooperative Society LTD (Hantex), President of various workers' unions such as Government Press Workers union, SIDCO Employees Association, K V Surendranath Trust, Headload Workers Union, Toddy Tappers Union, Supplyco Employees Association, Municipal Workers Union.

G.R. Anil contested the Assembly polls for the first time in 2021 and won from Nedumangad constituency by a margin of 23309 votes. He is currently serving as minister of Food and Civil Supplies, Consumer Affairs, Legal Metrology in Pinarayi Vijayan Government from 20th May 2021 onwards.

Personal life 

His family includes his wife Dr R. Latha Devi who represented Chadayamangalam constituency in 10th Kerala Legislative Assembly, daughter Adv. Devika A.L, son in law Major Vishnu S.P and grand daughter Anugraha Veda.

References 

Kerala MLAs 2021–2026
Communist Party of India politicians from Kerala
Year of birth missing (living people)
Living people